Bhamakalapam is a 2022 Indian Telugu-language crime comedy thriller film written and directed by Abhimanyu. Produced by SVCC Digital, the film stars Priyamani alongside John Vijay, Shanthi Rao, and Sharanya Pradeep. The film's soundtrack and score is composed by Justin Prabhakaran and Mark K. Robin, respectively.

The title and the central theme of the film is inspired from Bhamakalapam, a traditional dance form of Andhra Pradesh which refers to the story of a headstrong, proud Satyabhama. Bhamakalapam was premiered on 11 February 2022 on Aha.

Plot 
Plot starts with a young kid listening to a preacher at a spiritual gathering talking about the story of a special egg. According to the story, there was an egg that Mary brings to people after Jesus was crucified to indicate the return of Jesus in 3 days. Jesus was known to return after 3 days.
In the current time, an Egg is stolen from a Museum in Kolkata which is worth ₹200 crore. It is one of the few precious Easter eggs made by a Russian jewellery maker Faberge which used to be owned by kings of old times. With the stolen egg, Mani and his associate, on their way to the ring leader Nayar meet with an accident on a bridge. The Egg falls off from the bridge and lands on a poultry truck among the edible eggs. Nayar kills the associate and orders Mani to find the Egg or meet the same fate.

Anupama is a nosy neighbour in an apartment complex who lives there with her husband Mohan and son Varun. She does cooking videos on YouTube. She is too interested in other people's affairs, always observing others through the window and gathering information from Shilpa, who works as a maid in the apartments. Feroz, a poultry shop owner finds the Egg, decides to steal it and hides it in his home. He lives in the same society as Anupama. Mani knows that Feroz has the Egg through his assistant. Feroz and his wife have an argument one night and the following day his wife isn't seen home. Anupama who observed the argument through the window suspects something and decides to know what happened. With the help of Shilpa, Anupama manages to get a fake key and stumbles upon the dead body of Feroz inside. Mani, who is there to collect the Egg attacks Anupama. In a scuffle, Anupama stabs Mani with a fork which makes him unconscious. She drags Mani's body into her house and hides it in the kitchen.

Police arrive at the apartment next day to investigate Feroz's murder, team led by officer Pallavi. They suspect Mani of killing Feroz and fleeing away. On the other hand, Nayar's men steal apartment's CC footage where they see Anupama carrying Mani's body. Nayar blackmails Anupama to find the Egg and bring it to him. She couldn't find the Egg in Feroz's house nor in Mani's pockets. Anupama in an attempt to smuggle the dead body out with the help of an associate gets caught by a corrupt constable. After they throw the body in a river packed in a suitcase, the constable demands money stopping their vehicle on way home. Nayar gets him killed and orders Anupama to bring the Egg and kidnaps her son, Varun.

It is revealed that Feroz's wife is the one who took the Egg. She is a disciple of Daniel Babu, a religious leader. He believes that it is the Egg which was spoken about in the story of Mary/Jesus and he awaits the descent of God to Earth. He is the one who actually killed Feroz and now also kills another woman in the apartment who finds out the truth. Anupama recollects that she saw a locket in Feroz's house while searching for the Egg which actually belongs to Daniel. With the help of Shilpa, Anupama hands over Daniel to Nayar and goes to his house in the search of the Egg.

Police discover Mani's body in the river along with a knife. Pallavi figures out that it is the same knife Anupama uses in her cooking videos. As Anupama finds the Egg and comes out of Daniel's house, Pallavi catches her and suspects her of the murders. Meanwhile, Daniel escapes Nayar by killing all of Nayar's men and reaches his house. He kills Pallavi and starts firing at Anupama. She manages to survive after taking a bullet. Meanwhile, Mohan arrives with Police and they take Daniel into custody. Film ends with a message : "Not to await the God and believe in human power"

Cast 

 Priyamani as Anupama Mohan, an ambitious homemaker who runs cookery channel on YouTube
 John Vijay as Nayar
 Shanthi Rao as Pallavi, an investigation officer
 Sharanya Pradeep as Shilpa
 Pandiyan
 Kishore as Daniel
 Pradeep Rudra as Mohan, Anupama's husband
 Pammi Sai as Chinna Roa
 Nellore Neeraja
 Ravinder Bommakanti
 Sameera
 Balaji
 M S Raaja as Mani
 Sai Mukhesh

Production 
Bhama Kalapam marks Priyamani's first web film. The film was primarily shot indoors owing to the restrictions due to COVID-19 pandemic. Filming took place predominantly at a gated community in Hyderabad and was shot in 25 days.

Reception 
The Times of India gave a critical rating of 3 out of 5, writing "The film had all the ingredients of a great thriller comedy, but its ambitions were let down by the overarching runtime and lack of brevity" and further praised Priyamani's performance stating: "Priyamani as Anupama proves to be a saving grace and breezes through effortlessly. The audience would continue watching the film to root for her character". Sangeetha Devi Dundoo of The Hindu felt that "In the first few minutes, as the film finds its feet, it is hard not to be reminded of the 2018 Hindi film Andhadhun, even if faintly. A lamb crosses the path and a car meets with an accident that changes the course of things. The plot bears no resemblance to Andhadhun but this film exists in a zone that is similar to that widely appreciated macabre crime comedy". On a final note, she wrote that "Bhamakalapam is an interesting departure from mainstream Telugu film tropes".

In their review, 123Telugu stated, "On the whole, the film is a murder mystery with an interesting premise. Priyamani's performance and twists are good. But the lack of proper drama and tension in the second half makes this thriller half-baked". Asianet praised Abhimanyu's writing of screenplay and story, Priyamani's performance and the background score.

References

External links 

 
 Bhamakalapam on Aha

2020s Telugu-language films
2022 comedy films
2022 crime thriller films
2022 direct-to-video films
2022 films
Aha (streaming service) original films
Films set in apartment buildings
Films set in Hyderabad, India
Films shot in Hyderabad, India
Indian comedy thriller films
Indian crime comedy films
Indian crime thriller films
Indian direct-to-video films